Dictyobia is a genus of tropiduchid planthoppers in the family Tropiduchidae. There are at least four described species in Dictyobia.

Species
These four species belong to the genus Dictyobia:
 Dictyobia atra Van Duzee, 1914
 Dictyobia combinata Ball, 1910
 Dictyobia semivitrea (Provancher, 1889)
 Dictyobia varia Doering, 1940

References

Auchenorrhyncha genera
Articles created by Qbugbot
Elicini